Gillian Anne Smith (born 22 November 1965)  is an English former cricketer who played as a right-handed batter and left-arm medium bowler. She appeared in 4 Test matches and 31 One Day Internationals for England between 1986 and 1993. She was part of England's winning 1993 World Cup team, taking three wickets in the Final, and, as of 2021, has the lowest bowling average in Women's One Day International cricket history (minimum 1000 balls). Her final WODI appearance was in the final of the 1993 Women's Cricket World Cup. She played domestic cricket for Yorkshire and Middlesex.

References

External links
 

1965 births
Living people
England women Test cricketers
England women One Day International cricketers
Yorkshire women cricketers
Middlesex women cricketers